Leena Sipilä (born 18 August 1931) is a Finnish sprinter. She competed in the women's 100 metres at the 1952 Summer Olympics.

References

External links
 

1931 births
Possibly living people
Athletes (track and field) at the 1952 Summer Olympics
Finnish female sprinters
Olympic athletes of Finland
Olympic female sprinters